Powers Music School is a musical institution serving New England for more than 50 years. Powers Music School is a community music center based in Belmont, Massachusetts. The School provides private music lessons, early childhood and group classes, ensembles, orchestra, theory, music therapy, and performance opportunities to over 1000 students throughout Massachusetts, New Hampshire, and Rhode Island.

Powers Music in the Community 

Powers Music School provides the greater Boston community with access to music education programs, well-known faculty, festivals, performances, and outreach programs. Powers offers instruction and performance opportunities for interested students of all ages. In addition, Powers Music School also runs the summer programs Music on the Hill (MOTH), Suzuki on the Hill, String Traditions, and Kids Crescendo. Music on the Hill (MOTH) offers jazz and classical training to advanced high school students, with an emphasis on chamber music, while Kids Crescendo provides a creative musical environment for younger kids.

Powers Faculty (partial list) 
Todd Brunel, Clarinet
David Stevens, Saxophone, Clarinet
Michael Shea, Piano
Xue (Shirley) Liu, Piano 
Peter Morelli, Piano
Judith Bedford, Bassoon 
Laura Blustein, Cello 
Jessica Cooper, Early childhood 
James Doran, guitar
Carol Hunt Epple, flute, baroque flute, MOTH**
Susanna Fiore, Family Drum Jam, Keys for Kids, Musikgarten
Sarah Freiberg, cello
Andrew Goodridge, Piano
Vladimir Gurin, Piano 
Jane Hershey, Viola da gamba, viol consort
Levon Hovsepian, piano
Faith Hutchison-Williard, flute
Yasuko Ishibashi, piano, Dalcroze Eurhythmics, Pow-Wow
Veda Kogan, piano
Lisle Kulbach, piano, lap harp, recorder
Collen McGary-Smith, cello
Tamara Medoyeva, piano
Peter S. Morelli, piano
Dubravka Sajfar Moshfegh, viola, violin
Sam Ou, cello, MOTH** 
Jane Parkhouse, Co-Artistic Director for Pow-Wow
Dimitar Petkov, viola, violin, MOTH**
Alfa Radford, organ
Natacha Rist, piano
Kathryn Rosenbach, Piano, piano accompaniment
Jay Rosenberg, Suzuki guitar, recorder
Michael Shea, Piano)
Lucy Joan Sollogub, Guitar, mountain dulcimer
Gary Spellissey, Percussion
Liana Zaretsky, violin, MOTH**

External links 
 Powers Music School Official Homepage

Belmont, Massachusetts
Education in Boston
Music schools in Massachusetts